Sofoluwe is a Nigerian surname. Notable people with the surname include:

Babatunde Adetokunbo Sofoluwe (1950–2012), Nigerian academic
Yisa Sofoluwe (1967–2021), Nigerian footballer

Surnames of Nigerian origin